The 99th Composite Brigade is a brigade formation of the Bangladesh Army. It was raised per the project "Establishment of 99 Composite Brigade for Safety and Security of Padma Multipurpose Bridge" and army development project "Forces Goal 2030".

History 
On 19 September 2013 Prime Minister Sheikh Hasina raised the flag of newly established 99 Composite Brigade at Army Aviation Hangar. The flag 58 East Bengal, 34 BIR and 20 Engineering Construction Battalion were hoisted on the same day.

The unit would need around 600mn taka ($7.5mn) annually which will be allocated from the fund of the army.

On 2014 army sought 326-acre land & Tk 17,740 million over four years to build the security installations for the bridge on both sides of the mega infrastructure.

ECNEC approved the project named "Establishment of 99 Composite Brigade for Safety and Security of Padma Multipurpose Bridge" on 115 acres of land on both the sides involving Taka 7,500 million on 13 October 2015 .

Functions 
 Implementation of the Padma Bridge project.
 Maintain security of the Padma Bridge.
 Oversee construction of the Padma bridge.
 Check for corruption.
 Discourage graft mongering firms and their officials.

Formation 
The 99 Composite Brigade comprises one Engineering Construction Battalion and two infantry battalions and an air defence artillery regiment. Soldiers and officers of the brigade were drawn from other units of the army.

See also 
 98th Composite Brigade

References 

Brigades of Bangladesh
Infantry brigades
Military units and formations established in 2013